Santo Isidoro is a civil parish in the municipality of Mafra, Portugal. The population in 2011 was 3,814 in an area of 24.83 km².

Population

Villages 
 Ribamar
 Picanceira
 Monte Bom
 Monte Godel
 Pucariça
 Lagoa
 Pedra Amassada
 Safarujo 
 Penegache
 Junqueiros
 Bracial
 Casais de Monte Bom
 Palhais

References

Freguesias of Mafra, Portugal